Zoram Decentralisation Front (ZDF) was a former regional political party in Mizoram, India. In 2018, the party merged with Zoram People's Movement.

References

Political parties in Mizoram
Political parties disestablished in 2018
2018 disestablishments in India
Political parties with year of establishment missing